Jean-Louis Richard (17 May 1927 – 3 June 2012) was a French actor, film director and scriptwriter.

Biography
Born as Jean Marius Richard in Paris, Richard was Jeanne Moreau's first husband from 1949 to 1951.

Partial filmography

1960: À bout de souffle (by Jean-Luc Godard) - A Journalist (uncredited)
1960: Austerlitz (by Abel Gance)
1961: Me faire ça à moi - Chief
1962: Jules et Jim (by François Truffaut) - Café customer (uncredited)
1963: La Peau douce (by François Truffaut) - Man in the street (uncredited)
1964: Mata Hari, Agent H21
1966: Fahrenheit 451
1968: Je t'aime, je t'aime (by Alain Resnais) - L'homme du wagon-restaurant
1980: Le Dernier Métro (by François Truffaut) - Daxiat
1981: Le Professionnel (by Georges Lautner) - Colonel Martin
1982: Le Choc (by Robin Davis) - Maubert, l'inspecteur de la DST
1982: Le gendarme et les gendarmettes (by Jean Girault et Tony Aboyantz) - The Brain
1983: Life Is a Bed of Roses - Pére Jean Watelet
1983: Confidentially Yours (by François Truffaut) - Louison
1983: Le Marginal (by Jacques Deray) - Antoine
1984: Swann in Love - Monsieur Verdurin
1984: Fort Saganne (by Alain Corneau) - Flammarin
1986: La femme secrète - Stirner
1987: Hôtel de France - Pierre Galtier
1988: Quelques jours avec moi (by Claude Sautet) - Dr Appert
1989: Les deux Fragonard - Saint-Julien
1991: Août - Lance
1992: The Sentinel - Bleicher
1992: La nuit de l'océan - Capitaine du chalutier
1992: L'Inconnu dans la maison (by Georges Lautner) - Lawyer
1993: Tombés du ciel (by Philippe Lioret) - Monsieur Armanet
1994: Joan the Maiden (Part 1: The Battles and Joan the Maiden) (by Jacques Rivette) - La Trémoille
1994: Joan the Maiden (Part 2: The Prisons) (by Jacques Rivette) - La Trémoille
1994: Grosse fatigue (by Michel Blanc) - Psychiatrist
1995: L'Appât (by Bertrand Tavernier) - Inn keeper
1995: L'Année Juliette - Sobel
1995: N'oublie pas que tu vas mourir (by Xavier Beauvois) - Benoît's father
1995: Fiesta - Commandant Romerales
1996: Stabat mater - Jean
1997: Lucie Aubrac (by Claude Berri) - Monsieur Henry
1997: After Sex (by Brigitte Roüan) - Weyoman-Lebeau
1997: Marianne
1997: Messieurs les enfants (by Pierre Boutron) - Albert Crastaing
1998: The School of Flesh - M. Thorpe
1998: Cantique de la racaille - Alexandre
1999: Peau d'homme cœur de bête (by Hélène Angel) - Tac Tac
2000: Le prof - Père Alexandre
2001: J'ai faim !!! (by Florence Quentin) - Montalembert
2002: Adolphe (by Benoît Jacquot) - Mr. d'Arbigny
2003: La vie nue - Le patron
2003: Mister V. (by Émilie Deleuze) - Patrice Lemoigne
2003: Mauvais esprit (by Patrick Alessandrin) - Docteur Drey (final film role)

References

External links
 

1927 births
2012 deaths
French film directors
Male actors from Paris
French male film actors
French male television actors